Once Over Lightly is a re-recorded studio album by American country singer–songwriter Hank Locklin. It was released in November 1965 via RCA Victor Records and was produced by Bob Ferguson. Once Over Lightly was a concept studio album that included 24 songs that were made shorter in length. It was Locklin's twelfth studio album as well.

Background and content
Once Over Lightly was one of several concept albums released by Hank Locklin during his career. Like his previous concept releases, Once Over Lightly focused around a particular theme. Consisting of 24 songs, Locklin re-recorded many of his former hit singles in what the liner considered to be a "compact arrangement." The original song lengths were shortened so that each track was under two minutes length. Among the re-recorded hits by Locklin on the album were "Send Me the Pillow (That You Dream On)," "Geisha Girl" and "Please Help Me, I'm Falling." In addition, Locklin recorded shorter versions of songs first made famous by other country artists. Among the record's cover tunes was Johnny Cash's "I Walk the Line," Hank Snow's "I Don't Hurt Anymore" and Brenda Lee's "Fool No. 1." Once Over Lightly was recorded at the RCA Victor Studio in August 1965. The recording sessions were produced by Bob Ferguson. It was Locklin's first album to be fully produced by Ferguson, who had previously co-produced a studio release of Locklin's.

Release and reception

Once Over Lightly was released in November 1965 on RCA Victor Records. It was Locklin's twelfth studio album in his recording career. It was originally distributed as a vinyl LP. Each LP had 12 songs in total on both sides of the record. It was later re-issued on a digital and streaming format in the 2010s. The project did not spawn any known singles upon its release. Once Over Lightly received a favorable response from writers of Billboard magazine in 1965, who called it "a powerful package." It later years, it received three out of five stars from Allmusic. The online publication also named four of the record's tracks to be "album picks." This included "Geisha Girl" and "Please Help Me, I'm Falling."

Track listing

Vinyl version

Digital version

Personnel
All credits are adapted from the liner notes of Once Over Lightly.

Musical and technical personnel
 Bob Ferguson – producer
 Hank Locklin – lead vocals
 William Vandevort – recording engineer

Release history

References

1965 albums
Albums produced by Bob Ferguson (music)
Concept albums
Hank Locklin albums
RCA Victor albums